Central Australia, also sometimes referred to as the Red Centre, is an inexactly defined region associated with the geographic centre of Australia. In its narrowest sense it describes a region that is limited to the town of Alice Springs and its immediate surrounds including the MacDonnell Ranges. In its broadest use it can include almost any region in inland Australia that has remained relatively undeveloped, and in this sense is synonymous with the term Outback. Centralia is another term associated with the area, most commonly used by locals.

As described by Charles Sturt in one of the earlier uses of the term "A veil hung over Central Australia that could neither be pierced or raised. Girt round about by deserts, it almost appeared as if Nature had intentionally closed it upon civilized man, that she might have one domain on the earth's wide field over which the savage might roam in freedom."

In a modern, more formal sense it can refer to the administrative region used by the Northern Territory government, as of 2022.

Administrative region

Economic region
There are six regions in the Northern Territory for the purposes of economic planning, as defined by the Northern Territory Government:
 Central Australia
 Darwin, Palmerston & Litchfield
 East Arnhem (also an LGA)
 Barkly Region (also an LGA)
 Big Rivers Region
 Top End

This region has an estimated population of total regional population of 41,000, serviced by Alice Springs (population 28,000). The town also services parts of South Australia, Western Australia and Queensland.

Local Government Areas (LGAs) make up the region:
 Town of Alice Springs (town)
 Central Desert Region (region)
 MacDonnell Region (region)
 Yulara (unincorporated town)

Climate
The region has a desert environment, meaning it is very dry, receiving on average just  of rainfall annually. Most of the annual rainfall falls during extreme rainfall events in the summer months. Moderate dry winters persist between May and October with hot, long summers from November to April.

Colloquial or general use
In more general usage, or when referring to the flora and fauna of Australia, the term "central Australia" may refer to a large area in the interior of the continent, including the Lake Eyre Basin, which stretches across three states and the NT. For many, the term "outback" is almost synonymous with central Australia.

See also

Central Australia (territory), Australian federal territory 1927–1931
Regions of the Northern Territory
Centre points of Australia

References

External links

Alice Springs Region

Regions of the Northern Territory